The Lago de Santa Isabel Environmental Protection Area is an environmental protection area in the state of Tocantins, Brazil.
It was created to protect the shores of the reservoir of a planned hydroelectric dam, which has not been given an environmental license.
Vegetation is in the Amazon biome.

Location

The Lago de Santa Isabel Environmental Protection Area (APA) is divided between the municipalities of Xambioá (43.28%), Riachinho (3.43%), Araguanã (1.28%) and Ananás (52%) in Tocantins.
The APA protects land along the right (east) bank of the Araguaia River opposite the São Geraldo do Araguaia Environmental Protection Area and the Serra dos Martírios/Andorinhas State Park on the left (west) bank.

History

The Lago de Santa Isabel Environmental Protection Area was created by decree 1.158 of 1 August 2002. 
The same decree created its managing council.
It was created to Its objective is to protect and conserve biological diversity and to control the process of occupying the land around the reservoir of the planned Santa Isabel hydroelectric power plant.
It would thus guarantee sustainability of natural resources and its aquatic and terrestrial environment.
In 2009 the Ministry of the Environment announced that it would not grant a license for the project.

Environment

The Lago de Santa Isabel Environmental Protection Area  is in the Amazon biome.
Vegetation is 26% savannah-rainforest contact, 12% open rainforest and 8% dense rainforest.

Notes

Sources

Environmental protection areas of Brazil
Protected areas established in 2002
2002 establishments in Brazil
Protected areas of Tocantins